Rhynencina longirostris is a species of fruit fly in the family Tephritidae.

Distribution
United States.

References

Further reading

External links

 

Tephritinae
Insects described in 1922
Diptera of North America
Taxa named by Charles Willison Johnson